Franz Stecker was an Austrian luger who competed in the late 1920s. He won a bronze medal in the men's doubles event at the 1929 European championships in Semmering, Austria.

References
List of European luge champions 

Austrian male lugers
Year of birth missing
Year of death missing